Pathirakalam (English: Nocturnal Times) is a 2018 Indian Malayalam-language film directed by Priyanandanan and starring Mythili.

Synopsis 
The film is about the dark and violent activities that happen in society today. The plot begins with finding Hussain who is a renowned researcher at Berlin University of the Arts and the father of Jahanara, the main protagonist. Hussain has missing for the past three months and there has been no follow-up on the missing case by the local police or judiciaries. Jahanara decides to take things into her own hands and, with her friend Mahesh, Jahanara sets out to find her father. The story follows Jahanara's journey and the difficulties and problems she encounters.

Cast 
Mythili
indrans
Sreejith Ravi
Kalesh Kannattu
Romanch as Aneesh

References

External links

2018 films
2010s Malayalam-language films
Films directed by Priyanandanan